The  Philadelphia Eagles season was the franchise's 36th season in the National Football League (NFL). They failed to improve on their previous output of 6–7–1, winning only two games. Eagles fans expected to get O. J. Simpson if they went winless. They finished 2–12, but the Buffalo Bills went 1–12–1 and got Simpson with the first pick. Before they won their twelfth game, which they won, the Eagles were on target for a winless season at 0–11. They were the first team in the NFL proper to lose eleven consecutive games in one season since their own 1936 season, though in the AFL the 1962 Oakland Raiders lost their first thirteen games.

The Philadelphia Eagles Santa Claus incident, one of the most infamous incidents in Philadelphia sports history, came at halftime of the final game of the dismal 1968 season, when the Eagles were on their way to losing to the Minnesota Vikings. The Eagles had planned a Christmas pageant for halftime of the December 15 game, but the condition of the field was too poor. Instead, the team asked a fan dressed as Santa Claus to run onto the field to celebrate with a group of cheerleaders. The fans, in no mood to celebrate, loudly booed and threw snowballs at "Santa Claus."

Offseason

1968 NFL Draft

Roster

Schedule 

Note: Intra-division opponents are in bold text.

Game recaps 
A recap of the scoring plays and the game scores by quarters during the year. The record after the team's name reflects this games outcome also.

Week 1 at Packers

Week 2 
Sunday, September 22, 1968

Played in Franklin Field on grass in  weather with a  wind

Week 3 
Sunday, September 29, 1968.

Played in Franklin Field on grass in  weather with a  wind

Scoring

1st Quarter Scoring Plays
 Eagles – Sam Baker 23-yard field goal
 Cowboys – Dan Reeves 2-yard pass from Don Meredith (Mike Clark kick)
2nd Quarter Scoring Plays
 Cowboys – Lance Rentzel 11-yard pass from Don Meredith (Mike Clark kick)
 Eagles – Gary Ballman 18-yard pass from King Hill (Sam Baker kick)
 Eagles – Sam Baker 13-yard field goal
3rd Quarter Scoring Plays
 Cowboys – Bob Hayes 44-yard pass from Don Meredith (Mike Clark kick)
 Cowboys – Don Perkins 10-yard pass from Don Meredith (Mike Clark kick)
4th Quarter Scoring Plays
 Cowboys – Mike Clark 26-yard field goal
 Cowboys – Lance Rentzel 8-yard pass from Don Meredith (Mike Clark kick)
 Cowboys – Craig Morton 4-yard rush (Mike Clark kick)

Week 4 
Sunday, October 6, 1968

Played at District of Columbia Stadium on grass in  weather with a  wind

Week 5 
Sunday, October 13, 1968

Played at the Cotton Bowl on grass in  weather with a  wind.

Scoring
1st Quarter Scoring Plays
 Cowboys – Pettis Norman 9-yard pass from Don Meredith (Mike Clark kick)
2nd Quarter Scoring Plays
 Cowboys – Rayfield Wright 15-yard pass from Don Meredith (Mike Clark kick)
3rd Quarter Scoring Plays
 Eagles – John Mallory 58-yard pass from Sam Baker (Sam Baker kick)
 Cowboys – Don Perkins 1-yard rush (Mike Clark kick)
4th Quarter Scoring Plays
 Cowboys – Mike Clark 26-yard field goal
 Cowboys – Mike Clark 21-yard field goal
 Cowboys – Craig Baynham 22-yard rush (Mike Clark kick)
 Eagles – Mike Ditka 4-yard pass from Norm Snead (Sam Baker kick)

Week 6 
Sunday, October 20, 1968

Played at Franklin Field on grass in  weather with a  wind

Week 7 
Sunday, October 27, 1968

Played at Pitt Stadium on grass in  weather with a  wind

Week 8 
Sunday, November 3, 1968

Played at Franklin Field on grass in  weather with a  wind

Week 9 
Sunday, November 10, 1968

Played at Franklin Field on grass in  weather with a  wind

Week 10 
Sunday, November 17, 1968

Played at Yankee Stadium on grass in  weather with a  wind

Week 11 
Sunday, November 24, 1968.

Played in Cleveland Municipal Stadium on grass in  weather with a  wind

Week 12 
Thursday, November 28, 1968 Thanksgiving Day

Played in Tiger Stadium on grass in  weather with a  wind

Going into this week’s games the Eagles are 0–11, the Buffalo Bills are 1–9–1, the Falcons are 2–9 and the Steelers are 2–8–1.

Scoring

1st Quarter Scoring Plays
 Eagles – Sam Baker 36-yard field goal
2nd Quarter Scoring Plays
 Eagles – Sam Baker 18-yard field goal
3rd Quarter Scoring Plays
 Eagles – Sam Baker 32-yard field goal
4th Quarter Scoring Plays
 Eagles – Sam Baker 35-yard field goal

Week 13 
Sunday, December 8, 1968

Scoring

1st Quarter Scoring Plays
 Saints Jimmy Hester 4-yard pass from Billy Kilmer (Charlie Durkee kick)
2nd Quarter Scoring Plays
 Eagles Gary Ballman 55-yard pass from Norm Snead (Sam Baker kick)
 Saints Billy Kilmer 2-yard rush (Charlie Durkee kick)
 Eagles Ben Hawkins 14-yard pass from Norm Snead (kick failed)
3rd Quarter Scoring Plays
 Saints Charlie Durkee 10-yard field goal
 Eagles Safety, Conjar tackled Brown in end zone
4th Quarter Scoring Plays
 Eagles Ben Hawkins 23-yard pass from Norm Snead (Sam Baker kick)
 Eagles Tom Woodeshick 30-yard rush (Sam Baker kick)

Week 14 
Sunday, December 15, 1968

During halftime of this last home game of the season, a group of Eagles fans showed their discontent by booing, and then throwing snowballs at, a performer dressed as Santa Claus.

Standings

References 

Philadelphia Eagles seasons
Philadelphia Eagles
Philadel